Sigourney Street is a bus rapid transit station on the CTfastrak line, located near the intersection of Sigourney Street and Hawthorn Street in Hartford, Connecticut, near Aetna corporate headquarters. It opened with the line on March 28, 2015. The station consists of one side platform and two island platforms to serve both through buses and those which enter and leave the busway at the station.

The I-84 Hartford Project will cause a realignment of the north end of the Ctfastrak busway. Some buses will terminate at the current station, while others will serve a new "Sigourney Street South" station en route to Union Station.

References

External links

Transportation in Hartford, Connecticut
CTfastrak
Transport infrastructure completed in 2015
2015 establishments in Connecticut
Buildings and structures in Hartford, Connecticut
Bus stations in Hartford County, Connecticut